The Odee Company is a commercial printer and promotional products company headquartered in Dallas, Texas.

It occupies  in northeast Dallas, and uses both digital and offset presses with a prepress and bindery.

The promotional product division was added in 1986 and imprints company logos on promotional products. It does both overseas outsourcing and domestic production. The offset press room runs on Heidelberg offset presses, and the digital printing division runs on DocuTech for black & white and HP Indigo for on-demand color. The company was owned by the Tatom family, and was purchased from Will Odee in January 1963. Buzz Tatom ran the company from 1984-2011 before selling it to long time Production Manager Jay Atkinson (with Odee since 1979), Sales Manager Travis Stein (with Odee since 2001), and long time industry friend Steve Holland who was Williamson Printing's top salesman for many years.

History 

The company was established in 1923 by Will Odee as a legal forms publisher. He stole the customer list from Martin Stationery at the time of being employed there. He mailed to all existing customers of Martin's and informed them that Martins Stationery was no longer in business and to buy all their legal forms from The Odee Company.

The Odee Company in the 1930s-1960s was the largest legal form publisher in Texas.  It became the Southwest distributor for Goes Lithography in 1924 for its stock and border blank printing. The region included the states of Texas, Oklahoma, New Mexico, Louisiana, Colorado, Arkansas, Mississippi and Kansas. Goes Litho was established in 1879 and printed many of the stock certificates of the time, many of which became collector's items. Although untrackable, many stock certificates sold in the aforementioned states were bought from the Odee Company. All of the artwork from the borders is copyrighted, and all Goes Lithography artwork bore an embedded, very small and unobtrusive, Goes insignia.

External links
OdeeCompany.com, corporate website
Customized Canvas online, the new B2C offering from The Odee Company
OdeeCompany.net, The Odee Company's promotional products catalog.

Companies based in Dallas